The 1806 United States elections occurred in the middle of Democratic-Republican President Thomas Jefferson's second term, during the First Party System. Members of the 10th United States Congress were chosen in this election. Neither chamber saw significant partisan change, with the Democratic-Republicans retaining a commanding majority in both the House and Senate.

See also
1806–07 United States House of Representatives elections
1806–07 United States Senate elections

References

1806 elections in the United States
1806
United States midterm elections